Sir Ernest Colville Collins Wilton  (born 6 February 1870 in Singapore; died 28 December 1952 in Ashington, England) was a British diplomat and President of the Commission for the Government of the Saar Basin between 1927 and 1932.

Life

His parents were both naturalised British, the Danish-born mother and father born in the Netherlands. He was educated at Bedford Modern School.

In 1890, he joined the British diplomatic service in China and worked in various diplomatic posts for the next 30 years. For his service in the British missions to Tibet and the related negotiations with China in 1904 as he was appointed Companion in the Order of St. Michael and St. George. During World War I, he continued serving in various diplomatic and customs posts in China.  He returned to Europe in 1919 and served as one of the Allied Arbitration Commission for 1919/20 Polish–Czechoslovak border conflicts for the border town Cieszyn (or Teschen). Subsequently, he was a British envoy in all three Baltic States. In 1923 he was promoted to Knight Commander of the Order of St. Michael's and St. George. From 1923 to 1926, he was a member of an International Commission to the Chinese Salt Trade before he was in 1927 appointed President of the Commission for the Government of the Saar Basin. In 1932, he resigned from that office to retire for health reasons.

References

External links 
 Dix Noonan Webb: Wilton's Biography

1870 births
People educated at Bedford Modern School
1952 deaths
Ambassadors of the United Kingdom to Estonia
Ambassadors of the United Kingdom to Latvia
Ambassadors of the United Kingdom to Lithuania
English people of Danish descent
English people of Dutch descent
People from Singapore
High Commissioners of the League of Nations at Saar
British diplomats in China